Markazi Province (Ostān-e Markazi) is one of the 31 provinces of  Iran. The word markazi means "central" in Persian. The capital of the province is the city of Arak. At the time of the National Census of 2006, the province had a population of 1,326,826 in 364,155 households. The following census in 2011 counted 1,413,959 people in 426,613 households. In 2014 it was placed in Region 4. At the most recent census in 2016, the population had increased to 1,429,475 in 455,866 households. Persians make up the majority of the province, but there are significant minorities of Azerbaijanis, Kurds, Lurs, etc.

Markazi province lies in central Iran. The present borders of the province date to 1977, when the province was split into the current Markazi and Tehran province, with portions being annexed by Isfahan province, Semnan province, and Zanjan province.

History

Markazi province was part of the Median Empire in the first millennium BC, which included all of the central and western parts of modern-day Iran. The region is considered to be one of the ancient settlements on the Iranian plateau. Numerous remaining ruins testify to the antiquity of this area.

In the early centuries of Islam, the name of the area was changed to Jibal or Kuhestan. By the early 10th century, Khorheh had become a famous city of Jibal province, followed by Tafresh and Khomein.

In recent times, the expansion of the North-South railroad (commonly known as the Persian Corridor) and the establishing of major industries helped boost development in the area.

Many figures in Iranian history trace their beginnings to this province. namely: Mirza Abu'l-Qasem Qa'em-Maqam, Abbas Eqbal Ashtiani, Mirza Taqi Khan Amir Kabir, Mirza Bozorg Qa'em-Maqam, Mahmoud Hessabi, Ayatollah Khomeini, Ayatollah Araki, and many others.

Administrative divisions

Cities 

According to the 2016 census, 1,099,764 people (over 76% of the population of Markazi province) live in the following cities: Arak 520,944, Ashtian 8,763, Astaneh 7,166, Aveh 3,906, Delijan 40,902, Davudabad 5,491, Farmahin 5,756, Gharqabad 5,375, Hendudur 1,918, Javersiyan 4,993, Karchan 3,743, Khenejin 3,235, Khomeyn 72,882, Khondab 7,810, Khoshkrud 5,246, Komijan 8,776, Mahajeran 20,346, Mahallat 43,245, Mamuniyeh 21,814, Milajerd 9,288, Naraq 2,592, Nimvar 7,507, Nowbaran 3,334, Parandak 6,886, Qurchi Bashi 1,374, Razeghi 826, Saruq 1,345, Saveh 220,762, Shahbaz 7,536, Shazand 21,181, Tafresh 16,493, Tureh 2,302, and Zavieh 6,027.

Colleges and universities
 Arak University of Medical Sciences
Arak University of Technology
 University of Arak
 Tafresh University
 Islamic Azad University of Khomein
 Islamic Azad University of Arak
 Islamic Azad University of Saveh 
 Islamic Azad University of Farahan
 Islamic Azad University of Ashtian
 Islamic Azad University of Tafresh
 Farhangian University of Arak
 Energy University (Saveh)

Gallery

References

External links

Markazi Government General
Foreign Commercial Centre of Markazi Province
Cultural Heritage Organization of Markazi province
Iran Chamber of Commerce, Industries & Mines

 
Provinces of Iran